James Cantamessa (born May 25, 1978) is an American-French basketball coach and former player. Following his college career at Siena College he went on to play professionally in Europe where he won the Belgium championship in 2005.

High school career
Cantamessa attended Blackhawk High School in Chippewa Township, Pennsylvania, where he starred at basketball.

College career
Cantamessa, a 6'8'' forward out of Beaver Falls, Pennsylvania, played college basketball at Siena College from 1996 to 2000, averaging 11.0 points per game over his four years and scoring a total of 1,316 points. He received All-MAAC Second Team honors in 1998 and All-MAAC Third Team honors in 1999 and 2000. He graduated from Siena College with a degree in business finance. In December 1998, he scored a career high 33 points in a win against George Washington.

Professional career
Cantamessa, who also holds a French passport, kicked off his pro career in the 2000–01 campaign with Rouen in the French second division. He played for FC Porto in Portugal and in the European cup competition FIBA Korać Cup during the 2001–02 season.

Afterwards, Cantamessa played in the German Basketball Bundesliga with s.Oliver Würzburg (2002–03), Reims Champagne Basket in the French topflight ProA (2003–04), Euphony Bree (2004–2007) as well as Dexia Mons-Hainaut (2007–08) in Belgium. In 2005, he won the Belgium championship with Bree. He also saw action in the ULEB Cup and the EuroCup with Bree and Mons-Hainaut respectively.

Coaching career
Cantamessa was named assistant coach of Greensboro College's men's basketball team in 2010, associate head coach in 2015 and head coach in 2019. He was also named head men's golf coach at Greensboro.

References

External links
Profile at Eurobasket.com
Profile at proballers.com
College statistics at Sports-reference

1978 births
Living people
American expatriate basketball people in Belgium
American expatriate basketball people in France
American expatriate basketball people in Germany
American expatriate basketball people in Portugal
American men's basketball coaches
American men's basketball players
Basketball coaches from Pennsylvania
Basketball players from Pennsylvania
Belfius Mons-Hainaut players
College men's basketball head coaches in the United States
FC Porto basketball players
Greensboro Pride men's basketball coaches
Reims Champagne Basket players
Siena Saints men's basketball players
s.Oliver Würzburg players